William Alfred Wise (born July 21, 1923) is an American writer of children's literature. Among his well-known books are Christopher Mouse: The Tale of a Small Traveller (2004) and Ten Sly Piranhas (1993).

Life and education 
Born in New York City on July 21, 1923, Wise received a Bachelor’s Degree from Yale University in 1948 and published his first children’s book, Jonathan Blake: The Life and Times of a Very Young Man, in 1956.

Writings 
In addition to storybooks, Wise also published an abundance of children’s nonfiction, including In the Time of the Dinosaurs (1963), Monsters from Outer Space? (1978), and Zany Zoo (2006), as well as several biographies of important historical figures such as Albert Einstein, Alexander Hamilton, Franklin Delano Roosevelt, and Booker T. Washington. Wise also wrote the children's poetry collections No Sign of Santa! (1987) and Dinosaurs Forever (2000).

Wise’s career was not limited to children’s literature; he also wrote several books for an adult audience, including Massacre at Mountain Meadows (1976) a book about the Mountain Meadows Massacre of 1857 that explores the consequences of religious fanaticism. In 1980, Wise published The Amazon Factor, an installation of Harlequin’s “Raven House” mystery series. He also co-wrote the teleplays Kasrilekva on the Mississippi (1955), The Enemy (1956), and A World Full of Strangers (1958) with James Yaffe.

Bibliography

Children's literature

Fiction 
 Jonathan Blake: The Life and Times of a Very Young Man (1956)
 The House with the Red Roof (1961)
 The Story of Mulberry Bend (1963)
 Ten Sly Piranhas: A Counting Story in Reverse (A Tale of Wickedness—and Worse!) (1993)
 Nell of Branford Hall (1999)
 Christopher Mouse: The Tale of a Small Traveller (2004, illustrated by Patrick Benson)

Nonfiction

Biography and history 
 Silversmith of Old New York: Myer Myers (1958)
 Alber Einstein: Citizen of the World (1960)
 Alexander Hamilton (1963)
 Two Reigns of Tutankhamen (1964)
 The Spy and General Washington (1965)
 Franklin Delano Roosevelt (1967)
 Aaron Burr (1968)
 Booker T. Washington (1968)
 Cities, Old and New (1973)
 Monster Myths of Ancient Greece (1981)

Science 
 In the Time of the Dinosaurs (1963)
 The World of Giant Mammals (1965)
 The Amazing Animals of Latin America (1969)
 The Amazing Animals of Australia (1970)
 Giant Snakes and Other Amazing Reptiles (1970)
 Monsters from Outer Space? (1978)

Poetry collections 
 No Sign of Santa! (1987)
 Dinosaurs Forever (2000)

Literature for adults

Nonfiction 
 Secret Mission to the Philippines: The Story of the "Spyron" and the American-Filipino Guerillas of World War II (1968)
 Killer Smog: The World's Worst Air Pollution Disaster (1970)
 Massacre at Mountain Meadows: An American Legend and a Monumental Crime (1976)

Fiction 
 The Amazon Factor (1981)

References

1923 births
Living people
20th-century American non-fiction writers
American children's writers
Writers from New York City
Yale University alumni